Khlong Butsabong is a watercourse in the provinces of Phetchabun and Phichit, Thailand, and part of the overall Chao Phraya River basin. It is a direct tributary of the Nan River in the lower Nan basin.

Butsabong